Little Flock may refer to:

Little Flock, Arkansas, a city in the United States
Little Flock hymnbook, a collection of hymns used by the Exclusive Brethren
Local churches (affiliation), a Christian group based on the teachings of Witness Lee and Watchman Nee
The 144,000 'anointed ones', described in the Jehovah's Witnesses' theology of salvation